The Fukushima Bank Ltd. (株会社福島銀行 Kabushiki-gaisha Fukushima Ginkō) is a Japanese regional bank headquartered in Fukushima City, Fukushima Prefecture, Japan. Founded on November 27, 1922, the company provides banking (deposits, loans, foreign exchange trading, etc.) and leasing services as well as credit card and credit guarantee services. President and CEO, Takahiro Kato denies any intent to merge with Toho Bank Ltd., another regional bank located in Fukushima Prefecture.

Community Involvement 

 Employees of the company participate in Fukushima City's yearly Waraji Festival.
 The company hosts workshops to help children learn computer skills.
 For seven years, the company has hosted an exhibition and sale of goods handcrafted by people with disabilities (障がい者施設製品の大展示即売会 Shougai-sha Shisetsu Seihin no Otenjisokubai-kai).
 The company donates to a number of projects and non-profit organizations in support of preserving the natural environment of Fukushima.
 Under the title "Fukushima Bank Old Stories," the company attributed to a project aiming to promote the culture of Fukushima Prefecture. Four traditional Japanese storytelling performances were held and DVD copies were distributed to elementary schools throughout the prefecture.
 The company donates proceeds from their vending machines to support the victims of violent crimes.
 A light display is set up at the company's main office every winter season.

References 

Regional banks of Japan